Solvathellam Unmai previously known as Solla Thudikkuthu Manasu and also known as Nerkonda Paarvai is a 2009 Indian Tamil language reality-justice show about real-life situations. It aired on Zee Tamil from 2 October 2009 — 31 July 2011 and from 1 August 2011 to 30 May 2019 and from 1 June 2019 it is aired on Kalaignar TV from Monday to Friday at 08:00PM (IST). and later available on Behindwoods YouTube channel. The Show previously hosted by Vinodhini and from season 2 to till date it was hosted by Lakshmy Ramakrishnan. Whilst, Nirmala Periyasamy, Sudha Chandran and Shakeela hosted few episodes in season 2, 3 & 6  The show deals with genuine real life stories of people and portrays positive societal values for building a tolerant and harmonious Tamil Nadu and they try to come up with a solution for the same on the channel.

It is a socially responsive talk show aired on Zee Tamil from 2009-2019. From June 2019, it is aired on Kalaignar TV and available on Behindwoods - YouTube channel. The show focuses on providing psychological and legal counseling, aid, and guidance to disputing families and individuals.
It was instrumental in reuniting more than 1500 families. It received critical acclaim. It gained more popularity from the audience since its beginning and reached all over India.

It is the longest running Tamil television talk show crossing 3500+ episodes. The Show completes its 12 years and steps into the 13th year on 2 October 2021.

Format 
The show features common people seeking justice. It opens with the anchor saying a few words about the importance of expressing one’s needs and concerns to find what they need. She then invites a person onto the set to share their life experiences. He or She talks about some unfortunate incidents that have occurred in their life, something that led them to the point where they had to come in front of the camera to find solutions to their problems. After he/she says everything they need to, people concerned with the said problem are invited onto the set. They may be friends or family. They are given a chance to say their side of the story.

Once the anchor listens to both sides, she expresses her views on the topic and reprimands those who she thinks is guilty. She allows them to let out their feelings so that they can come to a conclusion. The panel leaves the set only after finding a solution. In some episodes, celebrities are invited where they are given a platform to talk about the struggles they have faced in life.

Seasons overview

Adaptations

In popular culture
The phrase Ennamma Ippadi Panreengalemaa spoken by Lakshmy Ramakrishnan in the show Solvathellam Unmai became popular. The dialogue was parodied in the TV show Adhu Idhu Edhu which became famous. Lakshmi threatened legal action against the makers of that show for demeaning her show. The dialogue was also parodied in films like Darling (2015), Massu Engira Masilamani (2015), Naanum Rowdy Dhaan (2015), Miruthan (2016) and Theri (2016). The dialogue also inspired a song of the same name composed by D. Imman for Rajini Murugan (2016). The show was parodied in films like Kadavul Irukaan Kumaru (2016) and Aruvi (2017).

References

External links 
 

Zee Tamil original programming
Tamil-language talk shows
2011 Tamil-language television series debuts
Tamil-language television shows
Television shows set in Tamil Nadu
2018 Tamil-language television series endings